Charles Smith (September 1756 – 9 May 1814) was a British politician. He sat in the House of Commons of Great Britain from 1796 until its abolition in 1800, and then in the House of Commons of the United Kingdom from 1801 to 1806.

He was the only son of Charles Smith of Stratford, Essex, who he succeeded in 1777.

He was elected at a by-election in November 1796 as one of the two Members of Parliament (MP) for the borough of Saltash in Cornwall,
and held the seat until 1802.  He was elected at the general election in 1802 as one of the two MPs for the borough of Westbury in Wiltshire, and held that seat until the 1806 general election. He was appointed High Sheriff of Essex for 1811–12.

He married twice: firstly Susanna, the daughter of John Devall of Marylebone, Middlesex and secondly Augusta, the daughter and coheiress of Joshua Smith of Erlestoke Park, Devizes, Wiltshire, with whom he had 3 sons and 6 daughters.

References

External links 
 

1756 births
1814 deaths
British MPs 1796–1800
High Sheriffs of Essex
Members of the Parliament of Great Britain for constituencies in Cornwall
Members of the Parliament of the United Kingdom for constituencies in Cornwall
Members of the Parliament of the United Kingdom for English constituencies
People from Essex
UK MPs 1801–1802
UK MPs 1802–1806